Covenant Christian Academy (CCA) is a private PreK–12 Christian school founded in 1997 by parents interested in giving their children a Classical Christian education based on the medieval model of the trivium. It is located in Harrisburg, Pennsylvania.

References

External links 
 

Christian schools in Pennsylvania
Classical Christian schools
Private high schools in Pennsylvania
Private middle schools in Pennsylvania
Private elementary schools in Pennsylvania
Schools in Dauphin County, Pennsylvania
Preparatory schools in Pennsylvania
Educational institutions established in 1997
1997 establishments in Pennsylvania